Mark Villiger (born 17 May 1950) is a Liechtenstein judge born in Louis Trichardt, South Africa, and former Judge of the European Court of Human Rights in respect of Liechtenstein. 

He grew up in Mozambique and Feldkirch, Austria before he studied law at the University of Zurich. He began his career at the European Court of Human Rights in 1983 as a secretary in the Human Rights commission and assumed as a judge of the ECHR in 2006.

References

1950 births
Living people
People from Louis Trichardt
Judges of the European Court of Human Rights
Liechtenstein judges of international courts and tribunals
Liechtenstein judges